Single-Handed or single-handed may refer to:

 Single Handed (1923 film), a silent Western film
 Single-Handed (1953 film), a British war film
 Single-Handed (TV series), an Irish television drama series

See also
 Single-handed sailing, sailing with only one crewmember
 Single-hander (disambiguation)